1. FC Frankfurt is a German football club based in Frankfurt (Oder), Brandenburg. The club was founded as the army club SV VP Vorwärts Leipzig in Leipzig in East Germany in 1951. The club won six East German championships as ASK Vorwärts Berlin and FC Vorwärts Berlin between 1958 and 1969.

History 
1. FC Frankfurt originally began as the football department of sports club SV VP Vorwärts Leipzig. The sports club was founded on 2 August 1951 and its first team was admitted to the 1951–52 DDR-Oberliga.

One of the characteristics of East German football after World War II, under the Soviet occupation and the socialist East German regime, was the willingness of the authorities to manipulate teams and clubs in various ways for political or other reasons.

The first team of SV Vorwärts der KVP Leipzig was relocated to East Berlin in 1953 and continued as SV Vorwärts der KVP Berlin The football team that began the 1952–53 DDR-Oberliga in Leipzig thus finished the season based in East Berlin. The sports club would undergo several name changes in the following years, before it was finally known as ASK Vorwärts Berlin.

 The club began a run of success in 1954 which included an FDGB-Pokal (East German Cup) that year, East German championships in 1958, 1960, 1962, and 1965, as well as losing appearances in the 1956 FDGB-Pokal, and the 1957 and 1959 national finals. Their success continued after the team was again renamed as the football department of ASK Vorwärts Berlin was separated from the sports club and reformed as FC Vorwärts Berlin, one of the new centralized football clubs formed to increase the level of performance throughout the country. Vorwärts won another two championships (1966, 1969) and in 1970 again made a losing appearance in the FDGB-Pokal final. Throughout the entire period from 1951–71, the side played in the DDR Oberliga (top tier).

In 1971, the club was moved again, this time from the capital to Frankfurt an der Oder on the German-Polish border, to replace the local secret police-sponsored side SG Dynamo, which was then disbanded. The decision to relocate the club was taken by the Ministry for Defence. The exact reasons for decision has not been fully clarified. The relocation was probably the result of political intrigues by the Ministry for State Security and the SED. German author Hans Joachim Teichler writes that all speculations end up with the head of the Ministry for State Security and the president of SV Dynamo Erich Mielke. Teichler suggest that Mielke somehow must have convinced the Minister for National Defence Heinz Hoffmann that two clubs of the armed organs in Berlin were too many. Mielke regarded FC Vortwärts Berlin as a competitor to BFC Dynamo in the capital. His fellow Politburo member and SED First Secretary in Bezirk Frankfurt Erich Mückenberger on the other end anticipated a boost for the Frankfurt an der Oder region. Vorwärts then enjoyed another decent run in the 1980s, going to the UEFA Cup four times (where they were twice knocked out by West German clubs, (Werder Bremen and VfB Stuttgart). In 1983 they finished second nationally.

After German reunification in 1990, the club dropped its affiliation with the army and became FC Victoria Frankfurt/Oder. After financial problems and re-organization in 1993 the side emerged as Frankfurter FC Viktoria (FFC Viktoria 91). In the early 1990s, they played a couple of seasons in tier III before slipping to division IV and V level play. The side then played in the Brandenburg-Liga (VI) before, on 1 July 2012, merging with MSV Eintracht Frankfurt to become 1. FC Frankfurt. The new club took over Viktoria in the Brandenburg-Liga and was aiming for promotion to the higher leagues. Their first success was winning the league in 2015, earning promotion to the NOFV-Oberliga for the first time in 12 years.

Nomenclature 
FC Vorwärts Berlin and its forerunners in Berlin were not related to the historical football club Berliner FC Vorwärts 1890. The name "Vorwärts" was in common use in East Germany for teams associated with security organs, notably the East German army.

The "E.V." in the present club name stands for the names of the two predecessors "Eintracht" and "Viktoria" respectively.

Forms and names

Honours

Domestic
 East German Champions
 Winners: 1958, 1960, 1962, 1965, 1966, 1969
Runners-up: 1957, 1959, 1970, 1983
 FDGB-Pokal
 Winners: 1954, 1970
Runners-up: 1956, 1976, 1981
 DDR-Liga (II)
 Winners: 1954, 1979, 1990

International
 European Cup
 Quarter-finals: 1969-70
 European Cup Winners' Cup
 Quarter-finals: 1970-71

Regional
 Brandenburg-Liga (VI) 
 Winners: 1997, 2003, 2015, 2022
Runners-up: 1996, 2021

European competitions

See also
Berlin derby

References

External links 

  
 Abseits Guide to German Soccer

 
Football clubs in Germany
Football clubs in Brandenburg
Football clubs in East Germany
Sport in Frankfurt (Oder)
Association football clubs established in 1951
Military association football clubs in Germany
1951 establishments in Germany
Sports team relocations